Golfland-Sunsplash is a water park and family entertainment center located in Mesa, AZ. The location is separated into two parks. Golfland operates as a year-round FEC and features three miniature golf courses, an arcade, a pizza restaurant, a go-cart track, bumper cars, and bumper boats. Sunsplash operates in the summer and features 29 water-based attractions.

The park opened in 1983 and the water park opened in 1986.

Golfland-Sunsplash is owned and operated by Golfland Entertainment Centers, Inc. Golfland Entertainment Centers was founded in 1953 and currently operates 8 properties. Mesa Golfland Sunsplash in Arizona, and 7 in California (including Roseville Golfland Sunsplash - a similar facility with a separate FEC and water park located in Roseville, California ).

Notable Events
 In the movie Bill & Ted's Excellent Adventure, Bill, Ted, and Napoleon visit a fictional waterpark called Waterloo in San Dimas, CA. The scenes at Waterloo are a cross between establishing shots at San Dimas Raging Waters and shots with the actors at Golfland Sunsplash.

Notable rides and attractions
 Thunder Bay is a 450,000 gallon wave pool.
 Splashwater Harbor Slides are the original four tube slides. There are two dark slides and two regular slides.
 Master Blaster (2002) is a water slide that uses jets to propel riders uphill, similar to a roller coaster.
 Sidewinder (2005) is a half-pipe style water slide.
 The Cauldron (2008) is a single rider body slide that drops into an open bowl. The first ever bowl slide was built at Golfland Sunsplash in Roseville, CA in 1999.
 Thunder Falls (2010) is a seven-story family raft ride with three high speed drops.
 The Stormrider (2011) is a four-person behemoth-bowl slide. At nearly 8 stories tall, it is one of the tallest slides in the southwest. The first ever Behemoth Bowl slide was built at Golfland Sunsplash in Roseville, CA in 2004.
 The Revolution (2012) is a two-person bowl slide with a high speed drop.
 Double Dare (2014) consists of two parallel racing body slides that start with ProSlide Technology's SkyBox trap door launch system.

External links 
 Golfland Entertainment Centers Official Website

1983 establishments in Arizona
Buildings and structures in Mesa, Arizona
Tourist attractions in Maricopa County, Arizona
Water parks in Arizona